Detention centres in Libya are criminal enterprises run by gangs of human traffickers and kidnappers for profit. Lawlessness in Libya has resulted in circumstances where criminals gangs abduct and detain people who are migrating to or through Libya. 5,000 migrants are held in dozens of camps that are mostly located around Bani Walid. Detainees often suffer torture and may face execution if their family do not pay ransoms to the gangs.

European governments who reject asylum seekers arriving by boat create circumstances where people are vulnerable to the activities of the gangs who run the detention centres. The detention centres have been publicly condemned by Pope Francis and Médecins Sans Frontières. Criticisms of the centres were contained in leaked documents from the German government. The United Nations Security Council called upon the Libyan authorities to close the centres in 2022.

Background 

Since the 2011 death of leader Moamer Kadhafi, Libya has become a route for migrants and refugees making their way to Europe. In 2014, armed conflict exacerbated lawlessness in Libya creating conditions where gangs can abduct migrants and detain them in camps with relative impunity. In 2018 there were approximately 700,000 migrants in Libya, and in 2021 there were more than 5,000 in detention centres.

The financial success of the camps is bolstered by a European Union funded effort to return migrants on boats to Libya. In 2018, Médecins Sans Frontières described "kidnapping for ransom" as a thriving business and criticized European Union-sponsored policies to deter refugees and migrants from traveling to Europe.

Operations 
The camps are run by Islamist militias, smuggling gangs, and the Libyan Coast Guard.

After migrants are abducted, detention center staff telephone the prisoners' families to demand ransoms. Detainees from Chad, South Sudan, Syria, Ghana, Sudan, Niger, and Nigeria suffer violence including beatings, rape, torture, starvation, and murder in the camps. Some people are held for over three years. Those whose family do not pay ransoms may be killed. A 2017 German diplomatic report stated that anyone who does not pay within a set period of time is executed. It quoted witnesses who spoke of precisely five executions every week, every Friday, scheduled to make space for new incoming abductees.

The value of ransom payments vary, with known examples ranging between 2,500 Libyan dinars (US$500) and 25,000 dinars (US$5,000).

Detention facilities are centred around Bani Walid where there are approximately 20 camps including Bani Walid detention camp. Al Mabani centre, which opened in January 2021, is located in Tripoli and detains approximately 1,500 abductees. The Triq al-Sika detention centre is located in Tripoli. The Tajoura Detention Center is located 16 kilometres east of Tripoli. The Al Nasr centre, also known informally as the "Osama prison," is located in Zawiyah.

Events at detention centres

Escapes 
In May 2018, many prisoners at Bani Walid detention center tried to escape, with most being recaptured or shot. In April 2021, more than 20 detainees escaped from a camp south of Bani Walid.

Tajoura centre airstrike 
On 2 July 2019 at 23:30, during the 2019–20 Western Libya campaign, an airstrike hit the Tajoura Detention Center, outside Tripoli, while hundreds of people were inside the facility. 53 people died and over 130 were injured.

Tripoli homicides and mass abduction 
In January 2022, over 600 migrants and asylum seekers were violently attacked outside the location of a former United Nations development center. Several people will killed in the attack, while most were subsequently imprisoned in Ain Zara detention center in Tripoli. The events prompted condemnation from the Norwegian Refugee Council and the  International Rescue Committee. The events were praised by Abdul Hamid Dbeibah.

Criticisms and prosecutions of centre leaders 
A leaked 2017 report from Germany’s Foreign Ministry detailed human rights abuses, and photographic evidence of "concentration camp like conditions.” In 2018, Médecins Sans Frontières condemned arbitrary detention of people and spoke out about the need for protection and humanitarian aid.” In 2019, following the 2019 Tajoura migrant centre airstrike a joint statement from the International Organization for Migration and the United Nations High Commissioner for Refugees called for "an immediate end to detention of migrants and refugees."

Human Rights Watch accused the European Union of "contributing to a cycle of extreme abuse" for its cooperation with authorities in Libya, and wrote that "The EU is providing support to the Libyan Coast Guard to enable it to intercept migrants and asylum seekers at sea after which they take them back to Libya to arbitrary detention, where they face inhuman and degrading conditions and the risk of torture, sexual violence, extortion, and forced labor."

In 2021, Pope Francis was critical of the camps, the "inhuman violence," and the policies that fuel them. In July 2022, the United Nations Security Council adopted resolution number 2647 which encouraged the Libyan authorities to close detention centres.

An Italian court found smuggler Osman Matammud, from Somalia, guilty of multiple counts of murder, abduction and rape. Osama Al Kuni Ibrahim was sanctioned by the United Nations in 2021 after he was accused by US authorities of “systematic exploitation of African migrants at the detention centre” at the Al Nasr centre."

In July 2022 the British Foreign, Commonwealth and Development Office called for all detention centres to be closed.

See also 
 Human rights in Libya
 Libyan Coast Guard
 Second Libyan Civil War

References 

Crime in Libya
Migration-related organizations
Prisons in Libya
Organized crime
Militias in Africa
Global politics
2019 in Libya
Military operations of the Second Libyan Civil War